Kimberly Davis may refer to:
Amber O'Neal, a professional wrestler whose legal name is Kimberly Dawn Davis
 Kimberly Davis, American singer-songwriter and member of Chic
Kim Davis, clerk of Rowan County, Kentucky.

See also
Kimberley Davies, Australian actress
Kim Davis (disambiguation)